Panau eichhorni is a moth in the family Cossidae. It was described by Roepke in 1957. It is found on the Solomon Islands.

References

Natural History Museum Lepidoptera generic names catalog

Zeuzerinae
Moths described in 1957